Donaghmede is a mixed socio economic residential suburb on the northern side of Dublin, Ireland, formed from parts of Baldoyle, Coolock and Raheny in the 1970s. It contains a mid-size shopping centre and a ruined chapel, and lies within the jurisdiction of Dublin City Council.

Location
It lies within the jurisdiction of Dublin City Council and the postal district Dublin 13. Donaghmede lies west of Baldoyle from which it was largely formed, north of Raheny, east of Coolock and Balgriffin and south of Portmarnock.

In the northern part of Donaghmede is the Grange Stream, running in culvert from western Donaghmede, past Grange Abbey and flowing into the Mayne River in northern Baldoyle.  Flowing through the southern parts of Donaghmede is another stream, the Kilbarrack Stream and/or Daunagh Water, culverted in stage in the 1970s and 1980s.  It reaches the sea at two points in lower Kilbarrack / Bayside, though in earlier times it joined with the Grange Stream and ultimately flowed into the Mayne River, feedback Baldoyle Bay.

Access

Road
Donaghmede is served by Grange Road [R809](to Baldoyle and Howth) and R139 from the Malahide Road and M50 and M1, to the north, and the Tonlegee Road [R104] to the south.

Rail
In the south eastern corner of Donaghmede is Howth Junction & Donaghmede railway station, situated on the Dublin–Belfast railway line and served by Dublin Area Rapid Transit (DART) and occasional InterCity (Iarnród Éireann) trains, while in the northern part is Clongriffin railway station.

Bus
Dublin Bus provides services on routes 29A (from the city centre), 17A from Kilbarrack Industrial Estate to Blanchardstown Shopping Centre via (Coolock, Santry, Ballymun and Finglas), 15 from Clongriffin to Ballycullen Road (via Malahide Road, City Centre, Rathmines and Terenure), and the 29N Nitelink service  with late night service from D'Olier Street to Baldoyle Road, stopping on Grange Road.

History and naming
Donaghmede was formed by Dublin City Council, which owned most of the lands, from around 1970, built-up from housing developments it had commenced on the inland areas of Baldoyle; the earlier history is that of the parent district.  Some lands of Coolock and some addressed as Raheny were also involved.  Further estates were added over the following decades.

The name of the newly-designated area was taken from the "big house" located in its assigned centre, Donaghmede House.

Historical features
The once popular Saint Donagh's Well, a holy well, was regularly visited for hundreds of years. It is said that the waters of Saint Donagh's Well healed eyes and rejuvenated eyesight. Saint Donagh's Well was once one of three local holy wells which were visited in procession.

In the northern part of Donaghmede is Grange Abbey, historically "a small church within the Grange of Baldoyle" which served as a chapel for the lands of the Priory of All Saints (now site of Trinity College Dublin).  The chapel, which once hosted a small parliamentary meeting, has been in ruins since at least 1615.

Facilities and amenities

Parks
The redeveloped Father Collins Park was officially opened by the Lord Mayor of Dublin in May 2009 and is Ireland's first "sustainable park" with five 50KW wind turbines protruding from the central linear water feature and providing power for public lighting, maintenance depots and football club changing rooms. The park also features a skate-park, 2 playgrounds, 6 playing pitches, picnic areas with outdoor chess/draughts boards, natural woodlands and a peripheral running/cycling track. Further information on the park including pictures, opening times etc. can be found on the Dublin City Council website.

Other green spaces lie around the main complex of schools, around the church and along the Kilbarrack Stream and above its culverted course.

Education
There are four primary (two junior, Scoil Bhride and St Kevin's, two senior, Holy Trinity and Naomh Colmcille) and three secondary schools (Grange Community College, Donahies Community School and Gaelcholáiste Reachrann) in the area, and a "vertical" school – catering for children from Junior Infants to Sixth Class – St Francis of Assisi Primary School – in the Belmayne estate in nearby Balgriffin.

Civic facilities
There is a Dublin Public Libraries branch library in the main shopping centre.

Sport
There are a number of soccer and Gaelic football clubs in the area along with the local Sports and Leisure Centre (http://trinitysportsandleisure.ie/). These include Wyteleaf United, Trinity Gaels GAA club, and Trinity Donaghmede FC (previously called "Donaghmede Celtic and Trinity Sports and Leisure Football Club") as well as newly formed F.C. Donaghmede who play home games out of Father Collins Park, while past clubs have included Carndonagh Athletic Football Club and Grange Abbey Boys FC. The area is also well served by the famous Trinity Boys Boxing Club.

Retail
Donaghmede Shopping Centre stands on the site of the original Donaghmede House. Dunnes Stores is the anchor tenant along with 50 other shops along with a cafe and a branch of Dublin City Libraries.  Currently, the centre is being improved and redeveloped. However a number of local residents groups, such as the Donaghmede Estate Residents Committee, and some public representatives, have opposed the developments.  The Donaghmede Inn pub and some other shops have direct access from outside.

Near the shopping centre is a medical centre with a pharmacy and cafe, and there is a small shopping precinct in Clare Hall, between Donaghmede, Ayrfield and Coolock.

Religion
Holy Trinity Parish Church, a distinctive cruciform building with a triangular profile, is Roman Catholic.  Located on Grange Road, Holy Trinity Church serves the combined ecclesiastical parish of "Donaghmede-Clongriffin-Balgriffin" in the Roman Catholic Archdiocese of Dublin. A large mosque and Islamic cultural centre was planned for the Clongriffin housing development, and received planning permission, confirmed on appeal but was abandoned.

Politics and community representation
Since 2016, Donaghmede has been part of the Dáil Éireann constituency of Dublin Bay North.

Donaghmede is part of the Beaumont/Donaghmede electoral ward for Dublin City Council, which also includes neighbouring Coolock, Artane, Edenmore, and Kilbarrack.  The Beaumount/Donaghmede electoral ward has nine elected local councillors with Sinn Féin being the largest party, taking more than 35% of the first preference vote and three seats in the 2014 local elections. Fianna Fáil, People Before Profit, Fine Gael, the Anti-Austerity Alliance and Labour Party secured one seat each, along with an independent councillor.

Residential
Unlike many other suburbs of Dublin, Donaghmede was not a village absorbed by suburban sprawl; rather it was an area of farmland, with a number of large houses with attendant workers' cottages (many of these latter survive along the Hole in the Wall Road that leads to Portmarnock, but none of the original "big houses" exist today).

Within Donaghmede are a number of housing developments, notably Donaghmede Estate, Grangemore, The Donahies, Grange Abbey, St Donagh's, Millbrook, Newgrove Estate and Howth View. The bulk of these developments were constructed between circa 1970–1974.  Newer developments included apartments at Priory Hall, and opposite those a number of developments forming Clongriffin.

Priory Hall
The apartment development at Priory Hall in northern Donaghmede was evacuated by order of the High Court made 14 October 2011, to allow for emergency fire safety works.  The 294 residents were originally due back by 28 November 2011, but as of May 2020, only some have been able to return.  The landowner and Tom McFeely, the owner of the construction company, are both bankrupt, with the latter first attempting to file for bankruptcy in the UK. This bankruptcy was overturned when it emerged that his main dwelling and business interests were in Ireland.  Declared bankrupt in Ireland in 2012, his €15m home in Ailesbury Road, Dublin 4, was re-possessed. In September 2013, €140,000 in €50 notes was found under the bath of his former Ailesbury Road house. The find is being probed by the Criminal Assets Bureau.  While most of the former residents were originally placed in a hotel, many were later rehoused in National Asset Management Agency property a couple of hundred metres to the east in Clongriffin, or to the west in the Belmayne development, south Balgriffin.

Notable residents

This list includes notable persons  who were born or have lived in Donaghmede, and these points, per modern Wikipedia policy, should be evidenced by a line-level citation.
Stephen Carr, football player with Birmingham City F.C.
Damien Dempsey, folk singer
Keith Duffy and Shane Lynch of Boyzone
Cathy Gannon, flat racing jockey
Edele and Keavy Lynch of girl band B*Witched
Rob Malone musician, guitarist for David Gray
JJ McCormack, champion cyclist and cycle sports official
Kasey Smith and Leigh Learmont of band Wonderland
Ryan Andrews, Fair City actor
Vinnie Murphy former Dublin footballer, All-Ireland winner 1995
Pamela Connolly, vocals/guitar/bass in Pillow Queens

See also
List of towns and villages in Ireland
Roman Catholic Archdiocese of Dublin

References

 
Towns and villages in Dublin (city)
Articles on towns and villages in Ireland possibly missing Irish place names